Parkview Mountain is the highest summit of the Rabbit Ears Range in the Rocky Mountains of North America.

From the summit a climber can see both Middle Park to the south and North Park to the North, hence the name of the Peak.

See also

List of Colorado mountain ranges
List of Colorado mountain summits
List of Colorado fourteeners
List of Colorado 4000 meter prominent summits
List of the most prominent summits of Colorado
List of Colorado county high points

References

External links

Mountains of Colorado
Mountains of Jackson County, Colorado
Mountains of Grand County, Colorado
North American 3000 m summits